The tenth Asian Championships in Athletics were held in early December 1993 in Manila, Philippines.

Medal summary

Men's events

Women's events

Medal table

See also
 1993 in athletics (track and field)

External links
 GBR Athletics

Asian Athletics Championships
Asian Championships in Athletics
International athletics competitions hosted by the Philippines
Sports in Manila
Asian Championships in Athletics
Asian Athletics Championships
Asian Athletics Championships